Supawat Yokakul (born 10 February 2000) is a Thai professional footballer who plays as a goalkeeper for Thai League 2 club Samut Prakan City.

International career
In 2020, He squad for the 2020 AFC U-23 Championship with Thailand U23.

References

External links
 

2000 births
Living people
Supawat Yokakul
Supawat Yokakul
Association football goalkeepers
Supawat Yokakul
Supawat Yokakul
Supawat Yokakul